The 1984–85 Coppa Italia was the 38th edition of the Coppa Italia tournament.  Sampdoria defeated Milan in the final for their first cup title. The first stage of the tournament consisted of eight groups of six teams. The top two teams from each group advanced to the knockout stage. Every round of the knockout stage was contested over two legs.

Group stage

Group 1

Group 2

Group 3

Group 4

Group 5

Group 6

Group 7

Group 8

Knockout stage

Final

First leg

Second leg

Sampdoria won 3–1 on aggregate.

Top goalscorers

References 

 rsssf.com
 Official site
 Bracket

Coppa Italia seasons
Coppa Italia
Coppa Italia